Herman Tollius (28 February 1742, in Breda – 29 April 1822, in Leiden) was a Dutch philologist and historian.

He studied jurisprudence in Leiden, earning his doctorate of law in 1763. From 1767 he served as a professor of rhetoric and Greek at the University of Harderwijk. Beginning in 1784 he was a private tutor to the children of Stadtholder William V. In 1809 he was appointed professor of statistics and diplomacy at Leiden, where he later worked as a professor of Greek and Latin languages.

Among his written efforts was an edition of Apollonius Sophista titled "Apollonii Sophistae Lexicon graecum Iliadis et Odysseae" (1788), and a work on constitutional writings involving events taking place in the United Netherlands in 1786/87, — Staatkundige geschriften, betreffende eenige gewigtige gebeurtenissenin de Vereendigde Nederlanden, gedurende de jaren MDCCLXXXVI, MDCCLXXXVII, en vervolgens.

His daughter Bartha produced a handful of pastel portraits, including one of her father.

References 

1742 births
1822 deaths
People from Breda
Academic staff of the University of Harderwijk
Leiden University alumni
Academic staff of Leiden University
Dutch philologists
19th-century Dutch historians
18th-century Dutch historians